La Gineta Club de Fútbol is a Spanish football team based in La Gineta, in the autonomous community of Castile-La Mancha. Founded in 1992 it plays in Tercera División – Group 18, holding home games at Estadio San Martín, which holds 1,000 spectators.

Season to season

3 seasons in Tercera División

External links
Official blog
Futbolme.com profile 

Football clubs in Castilla–La Mancha
Association football clubs established in 1992
1992 establishments in Spain
Province of Albacete